Gerald Tommaso DeLouise (born April 30, 1940), known professionally as Burt Young, is an American actor, author, and painter. He played Rocky Balboa's brother-in-law and best friend Paulie Pennino in the Rocky film series. He was nominated for the Academy Award for Best Supporting Actor for his work in Rocky.

He has also appeared in Chinatown (1974), The Gambler (1974),  The Killer Elite (1975), Convoy (1978), Uncle Joe Shannon (1978), Once Upon a Time in America (1984), The Pope of Greenwich Village (1984), A Summer to Remember (1985), Back to School (1986), Last Exit to Brooklyn (1990), Mickey Blue Eyes (1999), Transamerica (2005), Win Win (2011), Bottom of the 9th (2019), Beckman (2020) and the documentary film Stallone: Frank, That Is (2021) and had a guest appearance on The Sopranos in 2001.

Early life 

Young was born and raised in Corona, Queens, New York, the son of Josephine and Michael DeLouise, a high school shop teacher. He is of Italian descent.

He was trained by Lee Strasberg at the Actors Studio.

Career

Military service
Young served a tour of duty in the United States Marine Corps from 1957 to 1959; while in the Marine Corps, he boxed regular, winning 32 of 34 boxing bouts.

In acting
Young made his name playing rough-edged working class Italian-American characters, the best-known example being his signature role as Rocky Balboa's friend (and future brother-in-law) Paulie in Rocky (1976), for which he received an Oscar nomination for Best Supporting Actor. He is one of four actors (the other three being Sylvester Stallone, Stu Nahan and Tony Burton) who have appeared in all of the first six Rocky films (although Talia Shire, who appears in the first five films, makes a flashback appearance in the sixth). Young did not reprise his role in the 2015 film Creed; the character was described as having died in 2012.

He has played similar roles in Chinatown, Convoy, Back to School, The Pope of Greenwich Village, Once Upon a Time in America, Last Exit to Brooklyn, Downtown: A Street Tale, and even a brutal and darker role in Amityville II: The Possession. Young has also appeared in many television programs, including The Rockford Files, Baretta, Law & Order, Walker, Texas Ranger,All In The Family, M*A*S*H. He guest-starred in a Miami Vice episode, and made an appearance on The Sopranos ("Another Toothpick") as Bobby Baccalieri's father, who is dying of cancer and comes out of retirement to execute a hit on his godson, "Mustang Sally" Intile, as punishment for Intile having brutally beaten a family friend simply for chatting with Intile's girlfriend.  In a nod to his having served in the U.S. Marine Corps, he played a retired drill instructor in the short-lived 1987 ABC series, Roomies, where his character decides to go to college after his retirement.

In 2017, Burt Young returned to the stage as an aged mob boss in The Last Vig, a play written by Dave Varriale. The show ran from January 14 to February 19, 2017, at The Zephyr Theatre in Los Angeles.

As a painter and a writer
Young is also a painter; his art has been displayed in galleries throughout the world. As an artist, he has collaborated with the writer Gabriele Tinti, for whom he designed the cover for the poetry collection All Over, as well as contributing the illustrations for the art book A Man.  Some of Young's actual paintings were shown in a scene in Rocky Balboa when Paulie gets fired from the meatpacking plant.

Young is also a published author whose works include two filmed screenplays and a 400-page historical novel called Endings. He has written two stage plays: SOS and A Letter to Alicia and the New York City Government from a Man With a Bullet in His Head.

Personal life
Young is a widower. He has a daughter and a grandson. He resides in Port Washington, New York.

He owns a restaurant in the Bronx, New York. He participated in the 1984 New York City Marathon.

Filmography

Film

Television

References

External links
 
 

1940 births
Living people
20th-century American male actors
21st-century American male actors
Actors Studio alumni
American male film actors
American male screenwriters
American male television actors
American writers of Italian descent
Male actors from New York City
Military personnel from New York City
People from Port Washington, New York
People from Queens, New York
Screenwriters from New York (state)
United States Marines